Sheldon Turcott (1936 – February 18, 2000) was a Canadian television journalist and news anchor, best known as a reporter and host on CBC Television for four decades. He was a frequent contributor to The National, working at times as a newsreader, foreign correspondent, and executive producer of the program.

From 1985 until his retirement in 1995 he was the regular newsreader on CBC's Midday program. For a brief period prior to that, Turcott commuted to Regina each week to anchor CBKT's 6pm newscast, an effort to boost the station's nearly non-existent ratings.

He was also host of the quiz series TimeChase, and appeared in the feature film Murder at 1600.

References

External links

1936 births
2000 deaths
Canadian television news anchors
20th-century Canadian journalists